Nisha Rawal (born 18 November 1980) is an Indian actress, known for her role in television show Main Lakshmi Tere Aangan Ki (2011-2012).

Career
Before getting into acting, Rawal appeared in advertisements for Sunsilk, Coca-Cola and Fem Bleech. She also appeared in music videos. She made her debut in Bollywood with Raffo Chakkar and Hastey Hastey. She made her television debut with Aane Wala Pal on Doordarshan. She also worked in theatre where she featured in two different plays – Poore Chand Ki Raat and Ichha. She also participated in the dance reality show Nach Baliye 5 with Karan Mehra. She released her cover of "Ae Dil Hain Mushkil" as a surprise for her husband on occasion of their 5th wedding anniversary.

Personal life

Rawal was born on 18 November 1980. On 24 November 2012 she married TV actor Karan Mehra. In 2017, Nisha gave birth to a boy.

Filmography

Television

Films

References

External links

 
 

1980 births
Living people
Indian television actresses
Indian soap opera actresses
Actors from Mumbai